Pentland Hills is one of the seventeen wards used to elect members of the City of Edinburgh Council. Established in 2007 along with the other wards, it mainly covers the villages and suburban developments in the south-west hinterland beyond the A720 Edinburgh city bypass road (Baberton, Balerno, Currie, Juniper Green and Ratho, plus the campus of Heriot-Watt University), up to the boundaries with West Lothian, Midlothian and a small border with the Scottish Borders at the edge of the Pentland Hills.

Initially electing three councillors, within the bypass it covered the Kingsknowe neighbourhood and the southern part of the Wester Hailes housing scheme plus its smaller neighbour Clovenstone; the boundaries were redrawn for the 2017 election, losing Kingsknowe but gaining the northern part of Wester Hailes plus the Calders area, with the population increasing and four councillors being returned. In 2019, the ward had a population of 32,703.

Councillors

Election results

2022 Election
2022 City of Edinburgh Council election

2017 Election
2017 City of Edinburgh Council election

2012 Election
2012 City of Edinburgh Council election

2007 Election
2007 City of Edinburgh Council election

References

External links
Listed Buildings in Pentland Hills Ward, City of Edinburgh at British Listed Buildings

Wards of Edinburgh